The 1999–2000 First League of FR Yugoslavia was the eighth season of the FR Yugoslavia's top-level football league since its establishment. It was contested by 21 teams, and Red Star Belgrade won the championship.

Incidents 

The season was marred by a tragic event on 30 October 1999, during the Partizan vs. Red Star tie (113th edition of the Večiti derbi) when seventeen-year-old Red Star fan Aleksandar "Aca" Radović from Opovo was killed by a signalling rocket fired from within the stadium. Radović, a third-year student at the First Belgrade Gymnasium, was supporting his team from the Partizan Stadium's north end when in 20th minute of the match he got hit in the chest by a flare gun-fired signaling rocket from the opposite end of the stadium, which is where Partizan fans were located. Partizan had just scored courtesy of Saša Ilić to go up 1-0 and, as a way of celebrating the goal, certain section of their ultra fans, Grobari, fired a series of ship-signalling rockets from the south stand where they traditionally gather. Most of the rockets landed on the stadium's north stand, the gathering point of Red Star's fans Delije, and one of them hit the unfortunate teenager right in the chest near his throat, cutting his aorta. He died almost instantly as he was being moved from the stands onto the stadium's athletic track and into the ambulance car.

Amazingly, the match was not stopped and the two teams continued playing, a decision that led to a lot of public criticism directed at two clubs, the football league, and the FA.

Further investigation conducted by the police discovered that the particular rocket that killed Radović was fired by Partizan fan Majk Halkijević (born 1975) from Krnjača. In addition to Halkijević, three other individuals—Nenad "Kec" Kecojević (born 1976) from Mali Mokri Lug, Aleksandar "Sale" Aleksić (born 1975) from Krnjača, and Zoran "Prcko" Jovanović (born 1974) from Belgrade—were also firing rockets at the stadium during the match. According to the investigation, the German-made Comet ship-signalling rockets were originally purchased in Greece before being smuggled into Serbia. In Belgrade, Grobari leader Zoran "Čegi" Živanović bought 10 of them along with 60 flares, all from Mirko Urban. Čegi brought the stuff to Partizan Stadium on the day of the derby, handing it over to Časlav "Čaja" Kurandić. Čaja then took the flares and rockets into the stadium with help from FK Partizan's equipment manager Branko "Gavran" Vučićević who hid them inside the bags with team's sports equipment. Once inside the team's dressing room, the packages with flares and rockets were passed to Goran "Tuljak" Matović and Dragan "Lepi Gaga" Petronić through the dressing room's window. The packages were then carried through the east stand and onto the south stand through the protective fence while Nikola "Džoni" Dedović diverted steward's attention. On the south stand, group leader Čegi distributed the rockets and flares to a certain number of Grobari, including Majk Halkijević.

At an almost two-year trial before the Second Municipal Court in Belgrade, the defendants did not face murder charges but a lesser charge of "disturbing public order and causing general endangerment". The verdict by the presiding judge Nataša Albijanić was delivered on 1 March 2001, with Halkijević receiving a 23-month sentence. Aleksandar "Sale" Aleksić got 20 months while Nenad "Kec" Kecojević, Zoran "Čegi" Živanović (Grobari leader), and Časlav "Čaja" Kurandić got 18 months. Furthermore, Dragan "Lepi Gaga" Petronić and Srđan Šalipurović got six months, while Mirko Urban also known as Mirko Pekar (Mirko the Baker), accused of selling the rockets to Grobari, got 18 months. The rest of the accused—Zoran "Prcko" Jovanović, Nikola "Džoni" Dedović, Branko "Gavran" Vučićević, and Goran "Tuljak" Matović—were acquitted.

Teams 
Due to decision of the Football Association of FR Yugoslavia of enlargement of the league from 18 to 22 teams, the teams from earlier season was not relegated.

Before that season FK Priština was withdrew from the competition due to situation in Kosovo, so a status of the team was frozen.

From the 1998–99 Second League of FR Yugoslavia to the league was entered: Borac Čačak, Čukarički, Hajduk Beograd and Sutjeska Nikšić.

League table

Results

Winning squad
Champions: Red Star Belgrade (Coach: Miloljub Ostojić (sacked couple of weeks into the season), Slavoljub Muslin)

Players (league matches/league goals)

  Milenko Ačimovič
  Srđan Bajčetić
  Nikoslav Bjegović
  Branko Bošković
  Goran Bunjevčević
  Milivoje Vitakić
  Ivan Vukomanović
  Blaže Georgioski
  Stevo Glogovac
  Jovan Gojković
  Ivan Gvozdenović
  Ivan Dudić
  Goran Drulić
  Dejan Ilić
  Branko Jelić
  Aleksandar Kocić (goalkeeper)
  Nenad Lalatović
  Leo Lerinc
  Marjan Marković
  Dragan Mićić
  Nenad Miljković
  Vladislav Mirković
  Miodrag Pantelić
  Dejan Pešić
  Mihajlo Pjanović
  Dragan Stevanović
  Boban Stojanović
  Dalibor Škorić

Top goalscorers

References

External links 
 Tables and results at RSSSF

Yugoslav First League seasons
Yugo
1999–2000 in Yugoslav football